Qonaqkənd or Konakh-Kent or Konagkend or Konakkend or Konakhkend may refer to:
Qonaqkənd, Quba, Azerbaijan
Qonaqkənd, Shamakhi, Azerbaijan